Ermal Krasniqi (born 7 September 1998) is a Kosovan professional footballer who plays as a winger for Liga I club CFR Cluj and the Kosovo national team.

Club career

Early career / Ballkani
Krasniqi started his career in 2016 as an 18-year-old with Feronikeli, where after a year he was transferred to the club of his hometown Malisheva, with whom he managed to take third place in the Kosovo Second League, after good performances with Malisheva in the summer in 2018 he was transferred to the Kosovo Superleague side Llapi, but due to the lack of minutes he was forced to transfer to the another Kosovo Superleague side Ferizaj in January 2019, where he managed to play in ten games and score six goals, helping the team to stay in the middle of the table.

On 7 August 2019, Krasniqi signed a two-year contract with Kosovo Superleague club Ballkani.

CFR Cluj
On 10 January 2023, Krasniqi signed a three-and-a-half year contract with Romanian Liga I club CFR Cluj, and received squad number 7. CFR Cluj reportedly paid a €200 thousand transfer fee. His debut with CFR Cluj came thirteen days later against Farul Constanța after being named in the starting line-up, where he scored his side's first goal, as well as making an assist for his side's third goal during a 3–0 away win.

International career
On 29 August 2020, Krasniqi received a call-up from Kosovo U21 for the 2021 UEFA European Under-21 Championship qualification match against England U21, and made his debut after coming on as a 57th minute substitute in place of Valmir Veliu.

On 11 November 2022, Krasniqi received a call-up from Kosovo for the friendly matches against Armenia and Faroe Islands. His debut with Kosovo came eight days later in a friendly match against Faroe Islands after being named in the starting line-up.

Honours
Ballkani
Football Superleague of Kosovo: 2021–22
Kosovar Cup runner-up: 2019–20

References

External links

1998 births
Living people
People from Mališevo
Kosovan footballers
Association football wingers
Football Superleague of Kosovo players
KF Feronikeli players
KF Llapi players
KF Ferizaj players
KF Ballkani players
Liga I players
CFR Cluj players
Kosovo under-21 international footballers
Kosovo international footballers
Kosovan expatriate footballers
Expatriate footballers in Romania
Kosovan expatriate sportspeople in Romania